People is a 2004 French comedy film, directed by Fabien Onteniente. It's a sequel to Jet Set, released in 2000.

Cast
 José Garcia : John John
 Rupert Everett : 	Charles de Poulignac
 Ornella Muti : Aphrodita
 Élie Semoun : Cyril Legall
 Rossy de Palma : Pilar
 Patrice Cols : Branco
 Bernard Farcy : B.B. Bellencourt
 Jean-Claude Brialy : Minimo
 Miglen Mirtchev : Toukhanov
 Marisa Berenson : Daniella
 Lambert Wilson : Brother Arthus
 Patrick Mille : Feelgood
 Philippe Laudenbach : Professor Chernot

References

External links

People Jet Set 2 at AlloCiné 

French comedy films
2004 films
Films directed by Fabien Onteniente
2000s French films